Mudsill theory is the proposition that there must be, and always has been, a lower class or underclass for the upper classes and the rest of society to rest upon. The term derives from a mudsill, the lowest threshold that supports the foundation for a building.

History 
The theory was first articulated by James Hammond, a Democratic United States senator from South Carolina and a wealthy Southern plantation owner, in a speech on March 4, 1858. Hammond argued that every society must find a class of people to do menial labor, whether called slaves or not, and that assigning that status on a racial basis followed natural law, while the Northern United States' social class of white wage laborers presented a revolutionary threat.

It was directly used to advocate slavery in the rhetoric of other antebellum Democrats, who were struggling to maintain their grip on the Southern economy. They saw the abolition of slavery as a threat to their powerful new Southern market that revolved almost entirely around the plantation system, which was furthered by the use of primarily-African slaves but also used destitute whites.

Criticism 
Many saw the argument as a weak justification for exploitation and a flimsy example of creating science to reference as proof. An obvious flaw lies in that there are no indications as to which class or race rightfully belongs to the mudsill other than the pre-supposed regional groups that were already in place at the "bottom," thus causing a circular argument.

Mudsill theory and similar rhetoric has been dubbed "the Marxism of the Master-Class" which fought for the rights of the propertied elite against what were perceived as threats from the abolitionists, lower classes and non-whites to gain higher standards of living.

Abraham Lincoln argued forcefully against the mudsill theory, particularly in a speech in Milwaukee, Wisconsin, in 1859, where he delineated its incompatibility with Free Soil. In his view, mudsill advocates "conclude that all laborers are necessarily either hired laborers, or slaves" since to them, "nobody labors unless somebody else, owning capital... induces him to do it." Further, mudsillers believed that these laborers were "fatally fixed" in their status. Lincoln contrasted his view that labor was in fact the source of capital by noting that a majority of persons in Free States were "neither hirers nor hired" but in such professions as farming, where they worked for themselves.

See also

References

External links 
  The 'Mudsill' Theory speech at Wikisource
  "Mudsill Theory" introductory speech given by James Henry Hammond
 "Mudsill Theory", from John Taylor Gatto's The Underground History of American Education

1858 introductions
1858 establishments in the United States
Rhetoric
Culture of the Southern United States
Slavery in the United States
Political controversies in the United States
Sociological terminology
Sociological theories
Social class in the United States